Amy Roberta (Berta) Ruck (2 August 1878 – 11 August 1978), born in India, was a prolific Welsh writer of over 90 romance novels from 1905 to 1972. She also wrote short stories, an autobiography and two books of memoirs. Her married name was Mrs Oliver Onions from 1909 until 1918, when her husband changed his name and she became Amy Oliver.

Early life
Born Amy Roberta Ruck on 2 August 1878 in Murree, Punjab, British India, she was one of the eight children of Eleanor D'Arcy and Colonel Arthur Ashley Ruck, a British army officer. The family moved to Wales, where Ruck was educated at St Winifred's School, Bangor. She then attended the Slade School of Fine Art to study art, winning a scholarship, and finally the Académie Colarossi in Paris.

Bernard Darwin, the golf writer and grandchild of Charles Darwin, was her cousin.

Personal life
In 1909, Ruck married a fellow novelist, (George) Oliver Onions (1873–1961). They had two sons: Arthur (born 1912) and William (born 1913). Her husband legally changed his name to George Oliver in 1918, but continued to publish under the name Oliver Onions.

Berta Ruck was widowed in 1961. She was interviewed by the BBC in the 1970s about her life in the Victorian era. She died in Aberdyfi on 11 August 1978, nine days after her 100th birthday.

Many of Ruck's letters and manuscripts are archived in the National Library of Wales.

Writing career
Berta Ruck began to contribute short stories and serials to magazines from 1905. She published her first novel, His Official Fiancée, in 1914, which was the subject of two films: His Official Fiancée (1919, silent film directed by Robert G. Vignola) and Hans officiella fästmö (1944, Swedish film directed by Nils Jerring).

Partial bibliography

Novels

References

External links

National Library of Wales, Berta Ruck MSS
Berta Ruck tells BBC about everyday life of London in 1890s

1878 births
1978 deaths
20th-century English women writers
20th-century English novelists
Alumni of the Slade School of Fine Art
English fantasy writers
English centenarians
People from Murree
British women short story writers
People educated at St Winifred's School
Women science fiction and fantasy writers
English women novelists
20th-century British short story writers
Women centenarians
British people in colonial India